Riverside are a Polish progressive rock band from Warsaw. They were founded in 2001 by friends Mariusz Duda, Piotr Grudziński, Piotr Kozieradzki and Jacek Melnicki, who shared a love for progressive rock and heavy metal, although Duda, the main lyricist and composer of the band, was originally a fan of electronic, ambient, experimental music, like Radiohead, Massive Attack, Dead Can Dance, Tangerine Dream, Peter Gabriel, and later on, prog rock like Pink Floyd, Rush, Marillion, as well as thrash metal. Riverside can be described as a blend of atmospheric rock and metal elements, resulting in a sound similar to that of Porcupine Tree, Pain of Salvation, and Dream Theater.

History

Beginnings and Out of Myself 
One day near the turn of the millennium, during a short drive, Piotr Kozieradzki played Marillion in his car for Piotr Grudziński. While drummer Piotr 'Mitloff' Kozieradzki had played in two death metal bands, Dominion and Hate, and Piotr Grudziński had played guitar in a metal band, Unnamed, they both shared a deep affection for progressive rock. They were already friends with producer and keyboardist Jacek Melnicki who also owned his own studio. The three decided to experiment with progressive music but they needed a bass player to complete the lineup. Mariusz Duda, multi-instrumentalist and vocalist from the band Xanadu, agreed to attend a rehearsal in late fall of 2001 at the request of Jacek. Reactions to this first meeting between the four experienced instrumentalists were extremely positive.

After a few rehearsals, the members realized that they were involved in something special and deeply satisfying. Once a few compositions were completed, Mariusz attempted to sing in his own language, singing that was probably similar to the vocalizations in their future track "The Curtain Falls", although all future vocals and lyrics were to be written in English. Thus Mariusz began to take on the role of vocalist, as well as that of the bass player. In October 2002, about a year after their formation, the band performed a pair of shows in Warsaw. After the distribution of about 500 copies of their demo, the band performed at a small club in Warsaw once again in early 2003. As the band continued to write more material for a full-length release, there grew a dissonance between keyboardist Jacek and the other members of Riverside. Jacek wished to continue with his studio pursuits, so during the latter part of 2003, he split from the group.

The rest of the band was left to mix their first album, which was to be entitled Out of Myself. It was released in Poland in late 2003. The success of the album in Poland and the live shows that the band performed led to a release of the album on American record label Laser's Edge in September 2004, this time with cover art from Travis Smith, painter for bands such as Opeth, Katatonia, Anathema, and Devin Townsend. The album Out of Myself has won best debut in many magazines and websites such as Metal Hammer and Belgium Prog-Nose.

Voices in My Head and Second Life Syndrome 
Following their 2003 debut Out of Myself and the success that followed in 2004, the band began working on an EP entitled Voices in My Head which was at first a release exclusive to Poland through the label Mystic Production. The quartet from Poland performed their first foreign gig at the Progpower festival in the Dutch city of Baarlo. The band were taken in by major prog label Inside Out, releasing Second Life Syndrome in late October 2005. The album was a massive success, expanding the scope of the band's reach even further than Out of Myself. The album holds a formidable spot as number 62 on Prog Archives top 100 prog albums as well as the number one rated album of 2005. In 2006, Voices in My Head, the EP originally released in Poland only, was re-released under the InsideOut label, now revamped with the inclusion of three high quality live tracks off the Out of Myself album. In addition, the band played their first overseas show at NEARfest in Bethlehem, Pennsylvania on 24 June 2006. Soon after, the band would begin writing for its third full-length album and final instalment in the Reality Dream Series.

Rapid Eye Movement and Lunatic Soul 
In October 2007, the band released the album Rapid Eye Movement, once again under the InsideOut label. The European release had the standard nine tracks but the American release saw two versions of the album. One was a single CD with the nine tracks from the album, plus three tracks from their 02 Panic Room Single. This single CD was also exclusive to Mystic Production and therefore mostly unavailable to oversea fans. The other version contained 2 CDs, the first with the nine album tracks and the second disc containing the three songs from the single as well as two new, more atmospheric, compositions. Before the release, the band toured in support for Dream Theater on the European leg of their tour, exposing them to even more potential fans. Mariusz Duda released the self-titled debut album from his new project Lunatic Soul by Kscope on 13 October 2008.

Anno Domini High Definition and Memories in My Head 
The quartet's next album was "Anno Domini High Definition". Mariusz Duda had the following to say about the album on 27 January 2009:
	
"We have gone from Warsaw, we have changed the studio and the producer. We care deeply about creating a coherent record and that is why most probably there are only going to be five songs on it. The material will be energetic, multifarious, and - I hope so - very good for live performances. It will be a story about liquid modernity, life in a constant hurry, stress and anxiety about the future. A picture of our times in 1920 x 1080 definition."
	
The record was released in Poland by Mystic Production on 15 June 2009. Anno Domini High Definition became the best selling album in Poland during its second week on the charts, following a debut at sixth place.: The album was released on 6 June in the rest of Europe and on 28 July in North America. The band has tracked their recording process with the blog and website annodomininihighdefinition.com (which is no longer a registered domain).

The Limited Edition of Anno Domini HD is a 2-disc set. The second disc is a DVD that contains a seven-song video production. The show was taped at the Paradiso Theater in Amsterdam.

An EP entitled Memories in My Head was released in 2011.

Shrine of New Generation Slaves 
In January 2013, Riverside released their fifth full-length album, Shrine of New Generation Slaves.

Love, Fear and the Time Machine, Eye of the Soundscape and the death of Piotr Grudziński 
The sixth full-length album, Love, Fear and the Time Machine, was released at the beginning of September 2015 and obtained higher peak sales outside Poland than their previous albums.

On February 21, 2016, guitarist Piotr Grudziński died. He had attended a Winery Dogs concert in Warsaw the night before. It was revealed on March 4 that he had died of a pulmonary embolism. Riverside announced the cancellation of scheduled tour dates. On March 10, 2016, Riverside announced that a new album, a compilation of ambient and instrumental pieces of Riverside, was in progress. On August 21, the album was announced to be titled Eye of the Soundscape, and was released October 21.

On September 23, Riverside announced that they would not immediately  replace Piotr Grudziński, and would instead continue as a trio. Mariusz Duda will play the guitars on the albums, and session members will play guitars live. On February 22, 2017, it was officially announced that guitar player Maciej Meller (Quidam, Meller Gołyźniak Duda) would join the band as a touring member.

Wasteland 

On September 28, 2018, Riverside released their seventh album, and their first without Grudziński, Wasteland. The album was recorded as a trio with Duda on vocals, bass and rhythm guitar parts, Kozieradzki on drums and Łapaj on keyboards and hammond, plus some guest musicians.

The subject of the album was to be the post-apocalyptic world, or rather the stories of people trying to survive in the world after a catastrophe. It was an obvious reference to the situation of Riverside, who had been struggling to survive for two years after an unexpected tragedy. The style is heavier than the predecessor, that there is black metal riffs, slower paces, and the melodies would take on a Slavic flavor. Mariusz also talked about the influence of road movies and westerns, as well as games from the Fallout series, which fit well with the post-apo world and would help define the stylistic layer and mood of the album.

On February 3, 2020, Riverside announced that Maciej Meller had joined the band in an official capacity and would be involved in the writing sessions for their eighth album.

Members

Current members 
Mariusz Duda – lead vocals, bass guitar, acoustic guitar (2001–present), guitars (2016–2020)
Piotr Kozieradzki – drums, percussion (2001–present)
Michał Łapaj – keyboards, backing vocals (2003–present)
Maciej Meller – lead guitar (2020–present; touring member 2017–2020)

Former members 
Piotr Grudziński – guitars (2001–2016; his death)
Jacek Melnicki – keyboards (2001–2003)

Timeline

Discography

Studio albums 

Notes:

Compilation albums

Video albums

Live albums

EPs

Singles

References

External links

 

Polish progressive rock groups
Polish progressive metal musical groups
Musical groups established in 2001
Mystic Production artists
Musical quartets
Inside Out Music artists